Ashleigh Barty and Arina Rodionova were the defending champions, having won the previous edition in 2016, however both players chose to participate at the 2018 Miami Open instead.

Priscilla Hon and Dalila Jakupović won the title, defeating Miyu Kato and Makoto Ninomiya in the final, 6–4, 4–6, [10–7].

Seeds

Draw

Draw

References
Main Draw

ACT Clay Court International - Doubles